Salvador Dalí (1904–1989) was a Spanish surrealist. 

Salvador Dalí may also refer to:
 Salvador Dalí (film), a 1966 film by Andy Warhol
 "Salvador Dalí" (song), a song by Marracash and Guè Pequeno
 Salvador Dalí Desert, a desert in Bolivia
 Salvador Dalí Museum, a museum in Florida

See also
 Dali (disambiguation)